Slovenia competed at the 2016 Summer Paralympics in Rio de Janeiro, from 7 September to 18 September 2016.  Sports they qualified athletes to compete at included shooting.

Disability classifications 

Every participant at the Paralympics has their disability grouped into one of five disability categories; amputation, the condition may be congenital or sustained through injury or illness; cerebral palsy; wheelchair athletes, there is often overlap between this and other categories; visual impairment, including blindness; Les autres, any physical disability that does not fall strictly under one of the other categories, for example dwarfism or multiple sclerosis. Each Paralympic sport then has its own classifications, dependent upon the specific physical demands of competition. Events are given a code, made of numbers and letters, describing the type of event and classification of the athletes competing. Some sports, such as athletics, divide athletes by both the category and severity of their disabilities, other sports, for example swimming, group competitors from different categories together, the only separation being based on the severity of the disability.

Medalists

Competitors
The following is the list of number of competitors participating at the Games:

Athletics

Men's Road Events

Cycling

Road

Paracanoeing

Shooting 

The first opportunity to qualify for shooting at the Rio Games took place at the 2014 IPC Shooting World Championships in Suhl. Shooters earned spots for their NPC.  Slovenia earned a pair of qualifying spot at this event in the R4 – 10m Air Rifle Standing Mixed SH2 event as a result of the performances of Franček Gorazd Tiršek and Veselka Pevec.

The country sent shooters to 2015 IPC IPC Shooting World Cup in Osijek, Croatia, where Rio direct qualification was also available.  They earned a qualifying spot at this event based on the performance of Damjan Pavlin in the R5 – 10m Air Rifle Prone Mixed SH2  event. Franc Pinter earned a second spot for Slovenia at this competition in the R7 – 50m Rifle 3 Positions SH1 Men.

Swimming

Men

See also
Slovenia at the 2016 Summer Olympics

References 

Nations at the 2016 Summer Paralympics
2016
2016 in Slovenian sport